The Punjab Examination Commission (PEC) is an examination board to examine the students of class 5 and 8 in the Punjab. It is an autonomous body of School education department (Punjab, Pakistan). Started in 2006, it took its first class 5 exam at the same year.

References

External links
 PEC official website

2006 establishments in Pakistan
Government agencies of Punjab, Pakistan
Student assessment and evaluation
Organizations established in 2006